John C. Carr (November 18, 1929 – December 19, 1999) was an American editor, and Professor Emeritus at the University of Maryland.

Life
From 1965 to 1994, Carr was Adjunct Professor in the Drama Department at The Catholic University of America. 
He was an arts advocate associated with The John F. Kennedy Center for the Performing Arts.

Awards
 1981 - 1982 Distinguished Scholar-Teacher Award

Works

 Education in the world today. Editors Jean Dresden Grambs, John C. Carr, E. G. Campbell, 1972

References

1929 births
1999 deaths
American editors
Catholic University of America School of Arts and Sciences faculty
University of Maryland, College Park faculty